Buses in Adelaide are the most extensive service of the South Australian capital's public transport system, the Adelaide Metro. A large fleet of diesel, hybrid diesel-electric, and natural gas powered buses operate services which typically terminate in the city-centre or at a suburban interchange. Buses get priority on many roads and intersections, with dedicated bus lanes and 'B'-light bus only phases at many traffic lights.

History
Buses in Adelaide has been known under several names. The State Transport Authority (STA) combinined the metropolitan rail operations of the former South Australian Railways Commission, and the bus and tram operations of the former Municipal Tramways Trust in December 1975. In July 1994, the STA was abolished and government public transport services were transferred to TransAdelaide, a publicly owned corporation.

In 1995–96, there was a partial tendering out of bus services. TransAdelaide retained three contract regions, Serco, in its first Australian bus operation, won two contract regions, and Hills Transit, a TransAdelaide company, won the Adelaide Hills operating contract. Services were run and marketed under each operator's name, presenting a disjointed network to the public.

The 2000 round of tenders saw the end of TransAdelaide's (and therefore the Government's) direct operation of bus services in Adelaide, although it retained tram and rail services. Serco won the north–south, Outer North, and Outer North-East contract areas, Torrens Transit the east–west contract area and City Free services, Australian Transit Enterprises (ATE) trading as SouthLink the Outer South contract area, and Transitplus, a joint venture between ATE and TransAdelaide, the Hills Contract area. At this time the Adelaide Metro brand was implemented across all transport operators, appearing to the public as a unified network, with common livery, timetable designs and a city Information centre.

Fleet and Vehicles 
The Adelaide Metro bus fleet consists primarily of Scania L (4-series) (L94UB, L94UA) and K-series (K230UB, K280UB, K320UB, K320UA, K360UA) buses with various body styles from Custom Bus (CB60, CB60 Evo II, CB80) and BusTech (VST). There is also a significant number of older MAN buses of serval models and with several bodies. Smaller numbers of other buses also service the network. Contract operators also own some vehicles, with Torrens Transit/Transit Systems having a diverse fleet of buses transferred from other operations around Australia.

As of 2020, deliveries of Scania K320UB hybrid diesel-electric buses with BusTech VST bodies. In September 2022, the Minister for Transport announced that the final pure diesel bus have been delivered, and that all future deliveries would be hybrid diesel-electric or full electric.

Operators
Adelaide Metro buses are split up geographically into six contract regions:

The new contracts, awarded in March 2020, began on 5 July 2020 for a period of eight years.

Former operators which had operated Adelaide Metro services in the past but no longer operate in Adelaide are:
Light-City Buses - operated the north–south and Outer North East contract areas (including the 300 Suburban Connector and O-Bahn services) from 2011 until its purchase by Torrens Transit in 2018.
Transitplus - following the abolition of joint owner TransAdelaide in late 2010, Transitplus services were taken over by joint owner Australian Transit Enterprises's SouthLink.
Serco - Serco ended its contract in 2004, at the contracted half-term break-point.

System features

Go Zones
Many arterial roads leading towards the city have several routes servicing them, allowing for high frequency with a maximum wait of 15 minutes between 7.30am and 6.30pm on weekdays and every 30 minutes at night on weekends until 10pm. These are:

There is a Mega Go Zone on the Adelaide O-Bahn which has a 15 minutes maximum wait, 7 days a week. Mega Go Zone buses service Tea Tree Plaza Interchange, Paradise Interchange, Klemzig Interchange and the city.

Limited Stop Services

Limited stop services combine limited stops with express services to reach the outer metropolitan areas of Adelaide. Limited stop services include:

 Elizabeth station via O-Bahn, Golden Grove Village and Main North Road
 Greenwith via O-Bahn and Golden Grove Village
 Elizabeth station via O-Bahn, Ingle Farm and Interchange
 Mawson Interchange via O-Bahn, Ingle Farm and University of South Australia
 Salisbury via O-Bahn, Ingle Farm and Bridge Road
 Golden Grove Village to Flinders University via O-Bahn, City and Goodwood Road
 Golden Grove Village to Marion Centre Interchange via O-Bahn, City and Marion Road
 Noarlunga Centre via South Road
 Noarlunga Centre via South Road and Southern Expressway
 Seaford via South Road and Panatalinga Road
 Mount Barker via South Eastern Freeway
 Nairne via South Eastern Freeway
 Mount Barker via South Eastern Freeway and Hahndorf
 Aldgate via South Eastern Freeway and Stirling

Airport Services

JetBus airport services were introduced in August 2005. These are direct routes that link Adelaide Airport with the city and other key destinations. However, not all services are equipped with upright luggage rack facilities. On 10 November 2014, a new JetExpress bus, namely route J1X began running an express service between Adelaide Airport and the city with a BusTech CDi with Cummins ISL engine double-decker bus, equipped with a luggage rack on the lower deck. This bus is the first one of its kind operating in Adelaide public transport system after double-decker trolleybuses were removed from service in 1958. Bus routes are:

 Glenelg Interchange to City via Harbour Town Centre Interchange, Adelaide Airport and Sir Donald Bradman Drive
 City to Adelaide Airport
 Adelaide Airport to City via Grote Street, Wakefield Street, Pulteney Street, North Terrace and Sir Donald Bradman Drive
 Harbour Town Centre Interchange to City via West Beach, Adelaide Airport and Sir Donald Bradman Drive
 West Lakes Centre Interchange to Marion Centre Interchange via Queen Elizabeth Hospital, Adelaide Airport and Marion Road
 West Lakes Centre Interchange to Marion Centre Interchange via Torrens Road, Arndale Centre Interchange, Queen Elizabeth Hospital, Adelaide Airport and Marion Road

Free City Services

Free City Connector buses are zero-fare, wheelchair-accessible circuit routes that service the Adelaide CBD and North Adelaide daily which are joint of initiative of Government of South Australia, Adelaide City Council and Adelaide Metro, on four routes:

  City & North Adelaide Loop Bi-directional loop via North Terrace, Currie Street, Hutt Street, Halifax Street, Sturt Street, Grote Street, Morphett Street, Jeffcott Street, Ward Street, Hill Street, Tynte Street, Finiss Street and Frome Road. The 98A service is an anti-clockwise loop while the 98C is clockwise.
  City Loop Bi-directional loop via North Terrace, Currie Street, Hutt Street, Halifax Street, Sturt Street, Grote Street, Victoria Square, King William Street. This service operated under the '99C' only and it was only in 2014 that the name change took place. The 99A service is an anti-clockwise loop while the 99C is clockwise.
The 97A bus ran for a few months, so did the Beeline

There is another free service which only runs during the Adelaide 500.

O-Bahn Busway

The Adelaide Metro's most frequented route is the O-Bahn guided busway to Modbury carrying around 9 million passengers a year. It has three stations, Klemzig Interchange, Paradise Interchange, and Tea Tree Plaza Interchange at the Modbury end. Buses leave the track at Paradise or Tea Tree Plaza to continue services on normal roads, eliminating the need for passenger transfer.

After Midnight Services
Available only on Saturday nights, these night services run from midnight until 5am Sunday morning, departing the City every hour.

 Tea Tree Plaza Interchange / Golden Grove Village Interchange to City via Golden Grove Road and O-Bahn
 City to Tea Tree Plaza Interchange
 Marion Centre Interchange to City via Goodwood Road
 City to Aberfoyle Hub via Goodwood Road and Marion Centre Interchange
 City to Wattle Park via The Parade
 West Lakes Centre Interchange to City via Military Road and Henley Beach Road
 Newton to City via Montacute Road and Payneham Road
 Ingle Farm to City via Hampstead Road and North East Road
 [Gawler]] to City via Mawson Central Interchange and Main North Road
 Semaphore to City via Port Adelaide, Arndale Centre Interchange and Torrens Road
 Marion Centre Interchange to City via Glenelg and Anzac Highway
 Salisbury Interchange via O-Bahn and Paradise Interchange
 Fairview Park via O-Bahn and Hancock Road
 Moana via Marion Centre Interchange and Reynella
 Mount Barker via South Eastern Freeway, Crafers, Aldgate

Roam Zone

The Roam Zone concept began operation in the Hallett Cove, Sheidow Park and Trott Park area in September 2001. At specified times passengers can be dropped off or picked up away from bus stops, taking them to their door (or as near as the bus could get). Having done this, the roaming bus returns to its scheduled route. Roam Zones have bright blue bus stops located throughout. Adelaide Metro now features one Roam Zone:
Hallett Cove, Sheidow Park and Trott Park (from 7pm until last service daily)
 Hallett Cove Beach station to Flinders University
 Hallett Cove Beach station to Hallett Cove
 Hallett Cove Beach station to Sheidow Park
 Hallett Cove Beach station to Hallett Cove South

Adelaide Oval Footy Express
Adelaide Metro provide services between Adelaide Oval and areas across South Australia. Tickets for the games also act as the ticket to travel free on any Adelaide Oval Footy Express bus, train or tram, in order to alleviate overcrowding on regular services. Most services offer early arrival times and some routes will have services that leave an hour after the final siren. The locations in metropolitan Adelaide include:

 Old Reynella Interchange to Adelaide Oval via Brighton station, Marion Centre Interchange and South Road
 Aldgate to Adelaide Oval via South Eastern Freeway and Glen Osmond Road
 Paradise Interchange to Adelaide Oval via St Bernards Road and Magill Road
 Athelstone to Adelaide Oval via Payneham Road
 Burnside to Adelaide Oval via Greenhill Road
 Rosslyn Park to Adelaide Oval via The Parade
 Mawson Interchange to Adelaide Oval via Main North Road
 Rosewater to Adelaide Oval via Days Road and Torrens Road
 Port Adelaide and Outer Harbor to Adelaide Oval via Port Road
 West Lakes Centre Interchange to Adelaide Oval via Grange Road
 Henley Beach to Adelaide Oval via Henley Beach Road
 Blair Athol to Adelaide Oval via Prospect Road
 Mitcham Square to Adelaide Oval via Unley Road
 Mitcham Square to Adelaide Oval via Fullarton Road
 Glenelg Interchange to Adelaide Oval via West Beach and Sir Donald Bradman Drive
 Elizabeth station to Mawson Interchange via Salisbury Highway (transfer required)
 Salisbury North to Mawson Interchange via Paralowie (transfer required)
 Davoren Park to Elizabeth station via Smithfield station (transfer required)
 Aldinga to Noarlunga Centre Interchange via Seaford Interchange (transfer required)
 Greenwith to Adelaide Oval via O-Bahn
 St Agnes Depot to Adelaide Oval via O-Bahn
 Northgate to Adelaide Oval via Klemzig Interchange and O-Bahn
 Hope Valley to Adelaide Oval via Paradise Interchange and O-Bahn
 Salisbury East to Adelaide Oval via Paradise Interchange and O-Bahn
 Woodcroft Community Centre to Adelaide Oval via Main South Road
 South Adelaide Football Club to Adelaide Oval via Main South Road
 Mount Barker to Adelaide Oval via South Eastern Freeway
 Elizabeth Shopping Centre to Adelaide Oval via Main North Road
 Ottoway to Adelaide Oval via Arndale Centre Interchange and Hawker Street
 Aberfoyle Hub to Adelaide Oval via Goodwood Road
 Morphettville Depot to Adelaide Oval via Marion Road
 Oaklands Interchange to Adelaide Oval via Glenelg Oval and Anzac Highway

Interchanges and Park and Rides 
Connecting various routes and services throughout the transport network in Adelaide are several bus interchanges. These play a critical role in allowing for transfers between bus routes and some furthermore onto trains and trams. Interchanges are located in critical localities on the network where various routes meet. Since 2021, Adelaide Metro has worked to improve the signage throughout these various interchanges, with new totem style signs being implemented in all critical locations.

Experience with Contracted Bus Operations
The tendering out of bus operations has been a bumpy ride for Adelaide commuters. The original 1996 partial service tendering saw services run and marketed under each operator's name, presenting a disjointed network to the public. The Adelaide Metro brand was created in 2000 to restore a unified face to the public.

Contract holder Serco withdrew in 2004, at the contracted half-term break-point, after failing to renegotiate its contract on better terms. Serco had previously informed the Minister for Transport that it was not willing to continue to operate the bus services for a further five years on the terms contained in the then existing Contract. Serco had made a submission to the Department of Transport and Urban Planning proposing to operate the bus services in the contract areas on new terms and conditions. This submission was rejected by the Department of Transport and Urban Planning. The company unsuccessfully rebid for the contract in the subsequent competition.

Light-City Buses was awarded two of Adelaide's six public bus contract regions commencing operation in October 2011, taking over the North South and 
Outer North East Contract Areas from Torrens Transit.  These two contract regions cover 43% of the bus services in Adelaide, valued at $567 million over the eight-year life of the contracts. The contracts are in place for an initial eight-year term, from 2 October 2011 to 30 June 2019 with an option to extend for a further four years, subject to government approval. Since the start of operations of bus services by Light-City Buses in October 2011 service interruptions and delays which were initially dismissed as teething problems have continued to frustrate commuters. 
 Transfield has claimed most of the problems have been resolved and they are working on resolving the rest, however in May 2012, Transport Services minister Chloë Fox imposed a fine of $121,000 for failing to meet Performance Benchmark Targets:

 Transfield performed "significantly worse" than the other two companies operating contracted buses in Adelaide in reaching its contractual benchmarks.
 The number of Transfield buses running on time from 1 January – 31 March 2012 ranged from as low as 51.6% on Transfield North South contract region to 66.9% on the Outer North East region. Transfield was fined $121,000 for late running buses services as a result.
 In the 1 April – 30 June 2012 period Transfield, on-time running increased only marginally to 52.2% for the North South contract region and 71.3% for the Outer North East contract region. Transfield was fined $70,000 for its poor on-time running performance.

Transfield have said that new timetables in July 2012 should help get buses running on time.

The negative experience following this latest change of operators reflects the advice given to the Government in 2009, when it was recommended that contracts should be extended by negotiation, rather than re-tendered. The expert advice was based on:
 the efficiency of existing tender prices
 the incumbent operators' service quality performance
 the incumbent operators' entrepreneurship in regards to service development

The expert advice stated that:
 there are significant risks in any transition from one operator to another, including public uncertainty and staff unrest,
 there would be difficulties inherent in 'unpicking' the then current network structure and timetables,
 any change in operators was likely to present considerable risks, such as reduced service quality, reduced patronage growth, and limited benefits.

The South Australian Government went ahead with tenders in 2010. As noted above, the resultant change of operator from the incumbent Torrens Transit to Light-City Buses in the North South and Outer North East Contract Areas has seen many of the warnings given come to fruition.

Professor David Hensher, Director of the Institute of Transport and Logistics Studies at the University of Sydney, has commented that while three rounds of competitive tendering in Adelaide had ironed out the cost inefficiencies and lack of service incentives under the previous public monopoly model, 
It is not just service performance which is suffering; Government data shows a steady increase in patronage over the first two complete rounds of competitive tendering, followed by a sharp drop-off in the past two years.

See also
Transport in Adelaide
List of public transport routes in Adelaide
Transport in South Australia
Transport in Australia
List of bus companies

References

External links
Adelaide Metro
Office of Public Transport

Bus transport in South Australia
Zero-fare transport services